The Former Marine Police Headquarters Compound, completed in 1884, is located in Tsim Sha Tsui, Kowloon, Hong Kong. From 1884 to 1996, the Compound served as the headquarters for the Marine Police, which moved to Sai Wan Ho in 1996  

The compound is a declared monument since 1994 as it is one of the four oldest surviving government buildings in Hong Kong. The Compound and the Old Kowloon Fire Station have been re-developed into a heritage hotel with food and beverage outlets and retail facilities in a project headed by architect Daniel Lin of A+T Design, opened in 2009. The site is now officially renamed as 1881 Heritage.

History and design

The compound was completed in 1884 and served as the headquarters of the Water Police (as they were originally known) until late 1996. The main building was originally constructed on the waterfront, and had a dedicated slip prior to the reclamation of land to create Salisbury Road. To the east, the headquarters faced a sandy beach.

During the Japanese Occupation (1941–1945), the compound was used as a base for the Japanese navy. At this time, an extensive network of tunnels were constructed beneath the lawn but after World War II, these tunnels were blocked and the lawn was returfed for the safety of public.

In the 1970s, the compound lost a large part of its gardens, when the slope to the east was levelled to make way for the construction of Kowloon Park Drive.

The station was colloquially referred to as T-Lands Police Station – probably a reference to Marine Police brevity code for a marine police station on "Land" at "Tsim Sha Tsui". This name is used in at least two novels set in Hong Kong: Soldier of Fortune by Ernest K. Gann, published in 1954; and Dragon Flame by the house author Nick Carter, published in 1966.

Redevelopment

The Government announced on 23 May 2003 that Flying Snow Limited, a subsidiary of Cheung Kong Holdings, had won the 50-year land grant at a tendered price of  million, out of six competitive proposals. The approval allowed the developer to preserve and redevelop the historical building into a heritage tourism facility. Flying Snow has transformed the building into a heritage hotel with food and beverage outlets, and retail facilities. The project was the first private sector-led preservation project in Hong Kong; under the terms of the land grant, specific furnishings and features were required to be preserved and restored. The project opened as 1881 Heritage in 2009, and was criticized for removing most of the trees from what was once a grassy hill.

Because the prevailing market rate was  million per square metre, the under-counted existing floor space and below-market rate paid for the extra construction collectively were estimated to have provided an effective  billion bonus to Cheung Kong Holdings.

Buildings

The original Marine Police Headquarters comprises the Main Building, Stable Block and Signal Tower. The redevelopment into 1881 Heritage added the nearby Old Kowloon Fire Station and the Fire Station Accommodation Block to the campus.

Main Building

The Main Building was originally a two-storey structure; an extra storey was added to the Main Building in the 1920s, and an ancillary building was added to the north. The south-east and south-west wings of the main building served as married quarters, while the top floor of the west wing was the residence for the Superintendent of the Water Police. The Main Building also includes a small jail and carrier pigeon coops on the walls of the courtyard to the north.

After the 2003–09 renovation, the Main Building was renamed to Hullett House to honour Richmond William Hullett. It included a small boutique hotel offering ten suites and five restaurants and bars; each of the ten suites had a unique theme, and the Mariner's Rest bar allowed patrons to drink in a former jail cell.

In 2017, Harbour Plaza Hotels and Resorts assumed the management of Hullett House.

Stable Block
The Stable Block is immediately north of the Main Building.

Signal Tower

The Signal Tower, also known as the Time Ball Tower or Round House, was constructed to provide time signals to ships in the harbour. A ball was hoisted each morning and dropped precisely at 1 PM. Its use diminished in 1907 when the time ball apparatus was removed to Signal Hill, Kowloon.

Old Kowloon Fire Station

The Old Kowloon Fire Station, also known as the Former Tsim Sha Tsui Fire Station, was originally completed in 1920; a charity shop selling handcrafts occupied the space starting in 1986 until the 2003–09 renovations.

Fire Station Accommodation Block
The Fire Station Accommodation Block is immediately north of the Old Kowloon Fire station, and was completed in 1922.

Gallery

See also
 Adaptive reuse
 Revitalising Historic Buildings Through Partnership Scheme
 Historic police buildings in Hong Kong

References

External links

1881 Heritage official website
Former Marine Police Headquarters Compound — Antiquities and Monuments Office
Description and picture 
Description and picture

Government buildings completed in 1884
Infrastructure completed in 1884
Declared monuments of Hong Kong
Tsim Sha Tsui
Marine Police Headquarters
Police headquarters
Defunct police stations